The pageboy or page boy is a hairstyle named after what was believed to be the haircut of a late medieval page boy. It has straight hair hanging to below the ear, where it usually turns under. There is often a fringe (bangs) in the front. This style was popular in the mid 1970s and 1980s.

In popular culture

For women
In the early 1950s, the New York City hairdresser M. Lewis popularized this style. Singer Toni Tennille of the 1970s pop duet Captain & Tennille wore one as her signature look along with 1976 Olympic champion and 1976 World champion figure skater Dorothy Hamill. In the Oscar-winning film One Flew Over the Cuckoo's Nest, the villainous Nurse Ratched is known for her pageboy. In the Buffy the Vampire Slayer episode "Gone", Buffy has her hair cut into a pageboy. In the 1960s TV cartoon Underdog, the show's damsel in distress Sweet Polly Purebred (voiced by Norma MacMillan) has this hairstyle as her trademark look. AnnaSophia Robb as Violet Beauregarde and Missi Pyle as Violet's mother Scarlett Beauregarde in Tim Burton's film version of Charlie and the Chocolate Factory both sport pageboys. In the 2003 TV series All Grown Up! (a spin-off of Rugrats), Angelica Pickles (voiced by Cheryl Chase) sports a pageboy. Velma Dinkley, of the various Scooby-Doo animated series, has worn a short pageboy from her first appearance. Rei Ayanami from Neon Genesis Evangelion wears a shaggy pageboy. At the end of the Japanese anime series Kill la Kill, Satsuki Kiryuin cuts her hair into a page style. In John Green's novel The Fault in Our Stars, narrator and main character Hazel Grace Lancaster sports a pageboy haircut. The most prominent women to wear pageboys in the 1970s and 1980s were actress Joanna Lumley as the character Purdey in television's The New Avengers, and Diana, Princess of Wales. In fact it was also known as the "Purdey Cut" and the "Lady Di" in the UK at the time.

For men
The pageboy was first popular in the 1900s with young boys as it was first popularized by child actors, such as John Tansey and, later, Jackie Coogan. The pageboy look on boys is often referred to as the Dutch Boy look after the popular fictional character. The pageboy returned to male fashion in the 1960s for grown men with straight hair after getting popularized by British rock bands such as The Beatles and The Rolling Stones. This was copied by many of the U.S. Garage Rock/Punk bands, including The Chocolate Watchband, ? and the Mysterians, The Monkees and the Count Five. Andy Warhol and several members of The Velvet Underground also sported the androgynous haircut. The early Ramones haircuts were elongated pageboys, also sported, though less long, by the male members of Blondie. In the 1980s, the haircut became a symbol of Garage Punk and UK Beat music as seen on the album Rockabilly Psychosis and the Garage Disease and worn by bands with 1960s influences, such as the Barracudas and Primal Scream. Mansun lead guitarist, Dominic Chad, was known for sporting this haircut in the late nineties.

Although it is currently a hairstyle worn far more by women, many men have worn it, including characters such as Mowgli in Disney's 1967 version of The Jungle Book, He-Man in his 1980s incarnation, Anton Chigurh in No Country for Old Men, and the eponymous star of the American comic strip Prince Valiant. The latter instance inspired the pageboy's sometime nickname of "the Prince Valiant" or "Prince Valiant cut". The character of Willy Wonka as played by Johnny Depp in the film version of Charlie and the Chocolate Factory wore this hairstyle.

David McCallum wore the hairstyle the 1975 TV series The Invisible Man and child actor Adam Rich popularized it for children in the series Eight is Enough, which ran from 1977 to 1981.

The hairstyle is also displayed by the brothers Anthony and Phillip Bonfiglio, on the animated series, F is for Family.

See also
 Bob cut 
 Bowl cut
 Hime cut
 Pixie cut

References

External links
 
 

1900s fashion
1950s fashion
1960s fashion
1970s fashion
1980s fashion
1990s fashion
2000s fashion
Hairstyles